The Mona Lisa Has Been Stolen is a 1966 French comedy film directed by Michel Deville.

Cast
 George Chakiris as Vincent
 Marina Vlady as Nicole
 Margaret Lee as Marie-Christine Lemercier
 Paul Frankeur as Lemercier
 Jean Lefebvre as Gardien
 Henri Virlojeux as Le conservateur du Louvres
 Alberto Bonucci as Illusioniste
 Jacques Echantillon as Ernest
 Jess Hahn as Fêtard

See also
 The Theft of the Mona Lisa (1931)

References

External links
 

1966 films
1966 comedy films
1960s heist films
1960s French-language films
French comedy films
French heist films
French black-and-white films
Films directed by Michel Deville
Films set in 1911
Remakes of German films
Mona Lisa
1960s French films